The 1835 Michigan gubernatorial election was held on October 5, 1835. Democrat nominee Stevens T. Mason defeated Whig nominee John Biddle with 91.22% of the vote.

General election

Candidates
Major party candidates
Stevens T. Mason, Democratic 
John Biddle, Whig

Results

References

1835
Michigan
Gubernatorial
October 1835 events